Davide Bresadola (born 10 September 1988) is an Italian Nordic combined athlete. He has competed in most of the World Cup events in his discipline since 2005.

In 2004, he finished second at the Italian championships of Nordic combined skiing. At the 2006 Winter Olympics at Turin, Bresadola placed 44th with a time of 21 minutes 43.3 seconds.

References

External links 
  (Nordic combined)
  (ski jumping)
 
 

1988 births
Living people
Italian male Nordic combined skiers
Italian male ski jumpers
Olympic Nordic combined skiers of Italy
Olympic ski jumpers of Italy
Nordic combined skiers at the 2006 Winter Olympics
Ski jumpers at the 2006 Winter Olympics
Ski jumpers at the 2014 Winter Olympics
Ski jumpers at the 2018 Winter Olympics
Sportspeople from Trentino